Paracobitis rhadinaea, or the Easted crested loach, is a species of stone loach  the Sistan basin of Iran and Helmand River in Afghanistan. It is known from minor morphological differences between specimens.

References

rhadinaea
Fish of Asia
Fish of Iran
Fish of Afghanistan
Taxa named by Charles Tate Regan
Fish described in 1906